Coastal Television Network is a Monterey, California-based television network, broadcast on several Cocola Broadcasting low power television stations.  Its programming is oriented to the Monterey peninsula and central coast of California.

KAXT-CD previously aired Coastal programming on a digital subchannel.

References

External links 
 Coastal TV Network website

Companies based in Monterey County, California